Smuggled Cargo is a 1939 American drama film directed by John H. Auer and written by Earl Felton and Michael Jacoby. The film stars Barry MacKay, Rochelle Hudson, George Barbier, Ralph Morgan, Cliff Edwards and John Wray. The film was released on August 21, 1939, by Republic Pictures.

Plot
A corrupt consortium of fruit growers exploit migrant workers out of their rightful wages, until Gerry Clayton (Barry MacKay), the son of one of the growers, decides to champion their cause.

Cast
Barry MacKay as Gerry
Rochelle Hudson as Marian
George Barbier as Franklin
Ralph Morgan as Clayton
Cliff Edwards as Professor
John Wray as Chris
Arthur Loft as Masterson
Wallis Clark as Dr. Hamilton
Robert Homans as Kincaid

References

External links
 

1939 films
1930s English-language films
American drama films
1939 drama films
Republic Pictures films
Films directed by John H. Auer
American black-and-white films
1930s American films